Ignace Lepp (born John Robert Lepp; 26 October 1909 in Orajõe, Pärnu County, Livonia, Russian Empire – 29 May 1966 near Paris, France), was a French writer of Estonian origin.

According to his book Atheism in Our Time, Lepp was an atheist and Marxist for many years and claimed to have occupied important positions in the communist party with whom he later became very disillusioned. He then converted to Roman Catholicism and was ordained a priest in 1941. He wrote many non-fiction books including some about atheism, religion, and later psychiatry, as he was a psychologist and psychoanalyst.

He wrote among other books: The Ways of Friendship, The Psychology of Loving, The Authentic Existence, The Communication of Existences. He also wrote The faith of men; meditations inspired by Teilhard de Chardin (Teilhard et la foi des homme), about the French thinker Pierre Teilhard de Chardin.

Bibliography 
The Challenges of Life: Viewing Ourselves In Our Existential Totality, 1969
The Art of Being an Intellectual, 1968
The Depths of the Soul: a Christian Approach to Psychoanalysis, Staten Island, N.Y.: Alba House, 1966 (orig. Clarté et ténèbres de l’âme: Essai de psychosynthèse, Paris: Aubier, 1956)
The Ways of Friendship, New York: Macmillan Co., 1966
The Authentic Morality, 1965
A Christian Philosophy of Existence, 1965 
Atheism In Our Time, New York: Macmillan Co., 1963
The Psychology of Loving, 1963
The Christian Failure, 1962
Health of Mind and Soul, New York: Alba, 1966 (orig. Hygiène De L'Âme, Paris: Aubier, 1958)
Death & Its Mysteries, 1968

References

External links
 
Time magazine from 1963

1909 births
1966 deaths
People from Häädemeeste Parish
People from the Governorate of Livonia
French people of Estonian descent
20th-century French Roman Catholic priests
Converts to Roman Catholicism from atheism or agnosticism
French religious writers
French political writers
French psychology writers
20th-century French non-fiction writers
20th-century French male writers
French male non-fiction writers